The Coulter pine or big-cone pine, Pinus coulteri,(family Pinaceae) is a native of the coastal mountains of Southern California in the United States and northern Baja California in Mexico. Isolated groves are found as far north as Clearlake, California on the flanks of Mt. Konocti and Black Diamond Mines Regional Preserve. It is named after Thomas Coulter, an Irish botanist and physician.

Although it has a limited range in the wild, the Coulter pine is a popular ornamental tree and is grown in many countries.

Description
Pinus coulteri is a substantial coniferous evergreen tree in the genus Pinus. The trunk is vertical and branches horizontal to upcurved.

Each segment, or "scale", of the cone is tipped with a talon-like hook. Coulter pines produce the largest cones of any pine tree species and people are advised to wear hardhats when working in Coulter pine groves, although the slender cones of the sugar pine are longer. The large size of the cones, combined with the claw-like scales, has earned them the nickname "widowmakers" among locals.

Ecology
The Coulter pine is closely related to the foothill pine, Pinus sabiniana. It is more distantly related to Jeffrey pine with which it shares habitats, and the ponderosa pine. Coulter pines tend to grow in drier environments than ponderosa and Jeffery pines.

This erect, medium-sized pine prefers south-facing slopes between  elevation, and tolerates dry rocky soil. Pinus coulteri most often appears in mixed forests. The Coulter pine occurs in a number of forest plant associations; for example, At higher elevations forestation of the San Jacinto Mountains Coulter Pine is co-dominant with the California black oak. Woodpeckers often forage on the species, and peel the bark to access insects underneath.

Uses
Wildlife, especially squirrels, gather the large seeds. They were also once eaten by Native Americans.

The wood is weak and soft, so that the species is little used other than for firewood.

Pinus coulteri is cultivated as an ornamental tree, planted in parks and large gardens, and drought tolerant landscaping. The Coulter pine has gained the Royal Horticultural Society's Award of Garden Merit.

Gallery

References

Bibliography

External links

 
 Jepson Manual Treatment
 USDA Plants Profile for Pinus coulteri (Coulter pine)
 

Pinus
Pinus taxa by common names
Pine, Coulter
Pine, Coulter
Flora of California
Natural history of the California chaparral and woodlands
Natural history of the California Coast Ranges
Natural history of the Peninsular Ranges
Natural history of the Transverse Ranges
~
~
~
Decorative fruits and seeds
Garden plants of North America
Ornamental trees
Drought-tolerant trees